Tinker Tailor Soldier Spy is a 1974 spy novel by British author John le Carré. It follows the endeavours of taciturn, aging spymaster George Smiley to uncover a Soviet mole in the British Secret Intelligence Service. The novel has received critical acclaim for its complex social commentary—and, at the time, relevance, following the defection of Kim Philby. The novel has been adapted into both a television series and a film, and remains a staple of the spy fiction genre.

In 2022, the novel was included on the "Big Jubilee Read" list of 70 books by Commonwealth authors, selected to celebrate the Platinum Jubilee of Elizabeth II.

Background 
When Tinker Tailor Soldier Spy was published in 1974, revelations exposing the presence of Soviet double agents in Britain were still fresh in public memory. Guy Burgess, Donald Duart Maclean, and Kim Philby, later known as members of the Cambridge Five, had been exposed as KGB spies. The five had risen to very senior positions in branches of the British government. The book, based on the premise of uncovering a Soviet double agent in the Secret Intelligence Service (SIS), offers a novelisation of this period. It is also set against a theme of decline in British influence on the world stage after the Second World War, with the USSR and the USA emerging as the dominant superpowers during the Cold War.

David Cornwell, who wrote under the pseudonym John le Carré, worked as an intelligence officer for MI5 and MI6 (SIS) in the 1950s and early 1960s. Senior SIS officer Kim Philby's defection to the USSR in 1963, and the consequent compromising of British agents, was a factor in the 1964 termination of Cornwell's intelligence career. In the novel, the character of Bill Haydon, with his easy charm and strong social connections, bears a close resemblance to Philby.

The title alludes to the nursery rhyme and counting game Tinker Tailor.

Series 
Tinker Tailor Soldier Spy was followed by The Honourable Schoolboy in 1977 and Smiley's People in 1979. The three novels together make up the "Karla Trilogy", named after Smiley's long-time opponent Karla, the head of Soviet foreign intelligence. These were later published as an omnibus edition titled The Quest for Karla in 1982.

These are the fifth, sixth, and seventh Le Carré spy novels featuring George Smiley (the first four being: Call for the Dead, A Murder of Quality, The Spy Who Came in from the Cold, and The Looking Glass War). Two of the characters, Peter Guillam and Inspector Mendel, first appeared in Le Carré's first book, Call for the Dead (1961).

Plot summary

Background
As the tension of the Cold War is peaking in 1973, George Smiley, former senior official in Britain's Secret Intelligence Service (known as "the Circus" because its London office is at Cambridge Circus), is living unhappily in forced retirement, following the failure of an operation codenamed Testify in Czechoslovakia which ended in the capture and torture of agent Jim Prideaux. Control, chief of the Circus, had suspected that one of the five senior intelligence officers at the Circus was a Soviet mole, and had assigned them code names for Prideaux to relay back to the Circus, derived from the English children's rhyme "Tinker, Tailor":Tinker, tailor,
soldier, sailor,
rich man, poor man,
beggarman, thief.
The failure resulted in the dismissal of Control, Smiley, and allies such as Connie Sachs and Gerald Westerby, and their replacement by a new guard consisting of Percy Alleline, Toby Esterhase, Bill Haydon, and Roy Bland. Control has since died, and Smiley's former protégé, Peter Guillam, has been demoted to the "scalphunters".

Guillam unexpectedly approaches Smiley and takes him to the house of  Under-Secretary Oliver Lacon, the Civil Servant who oversees the Circus. There they meet Ricki Tarr, an agent recently declared persona non grata due to suspicion of having defected. Tarr defends himself by explaining that he was informed of a Soviet mole, codenamed Gerald, at the Circus' highest level whilst in Hong Kong by Irina, the wife of a trade delegate. Irina claimed that the mole Gerald reports to a Soviet official stationed at the  embassy in London called Polyakov. Shortly after Tarr relayed this to the Circus Irina was forcibly returned to the Soviet Union, leading Tarr to suspect that the mole was real, and now knew his identity. Tarr went into hiding, resurfacing to contact Guillam.

Lacon reasons that neither Smiley nor Guillam can be the mole, due to their respective dismissal and demotion, and so requests that Smiley investigate the presence of the mole in total secrecy to avoid another PR scandal for both the Government and the Circus. Smiley cautiously agrees, and forms a team consisting of himself, Guillam, Tarr, and retired Scotland Yard Inspector Mendel. Smiley is also given access to Circus documents, and begins by examining Alleline's restructuring, discovering the ousting of Jerry Westerby and Connie Sachs, as well as slush fund payments to Jim Prideaux.

Smiley begins the hunt
Smiley visits Sachs, discovering that she confronted Alleline about her discovery that Polyakov was actually a Soviet Colonel called Gregor Viktorov, but he ordered her to drop the subject. She also mentions rumours of a secret Soviet facility for training moles, and makes allusions to Prideaux and Bill Haydon's relationship being more than just platonic friendship.

Smiley examines Operation Witchcraft, an operation in which Soviet intelligence was obtained through a key source known as "Merlin", which was treated with suspicion by both Smiley and Control. Alleline obtained ministerial support to circumvent Control's authority, and his post-Testify promotion supporters Haydon, Esterhase, and Bland have sponsored it. Smiley also learns that this "Magic Circle" has obtained a safe house somewhere in London where they obtain information from a Merlin emissary posted in London under a diplomatic cover, whom Smiley concludes is Polyakov himself.

Smiley suspects that the Circus does not realise the flow of information is going the other way, with the mole Gerald passing important British secrets ("gold dust") in return for low-grade Soviet material ("chicken feed"), which would make "Witchcraft" simply a cover for the mole.

Karla
Smiley also discovers that the log from the night Tarr reported in from Hong Kong has been removed, and Guillam starts to suffer from paranoia as a result of their operation. Smiley tells Guillam that he suspects a Soviet intelligence officer named Karla is linked in some way to the operation, and reveals what he knows about him. Karla is believed to have followed his father into espionage, getting his start during the Spanish Civil War posing as a  White Russian émigré in the forces of General Francisco Franco, recruiting foreign, mainly German, operatives. After this, the Circus lost track of Karla, but he resurfaced during Operation Barbarossa, directing partisan operations behind German lines. Smiley explains his belief that somewhere in the gap between these two conflicts, Karla travelled to England and recruited Gerald.

Smiley points out that Karla is fiercely loyal to both the Soviet Union and communism, highlighting Karla's current rank despite his internment in a gulag by the Stalinist regime, and reveals that Karla turned down an offer from Smiley in India to defect, even though his return to the USSR in 1955 was to face a likely execution. During his attempt to obtain Karla's defection, Smiley plied him to defect with cigarettes and promises that they could get Karla's family out to the West safely. Smiley suspects that this only revealed his own weakness, his love for his unfaithful wife, Ann. Smiley offered Karla his lighter, a present from Ann, to light a cigarette, but Karla rose and left with it.

Merlin and Testify
Smiley suspects a link between Merlin and the botched Operation Testify. Sam Collins, who was duty officer that night, tells Smiley that Control ordered him to relay the report of the Czech operation only to him, but that when he did so, Control froze up, and that Bill Haydon's sudden arrival was the only reason the hierarchy didn't fall apart that night. Smiley then visits Max, a Czech operative who served as a legman for Jim on the operation, who tells Smiley that Prideaux gave him instructions to leave Czechoslovakia any way he could if Jim didn't surface at the rendezvous at the appointed time. Next, Smiley pays a visit to Jerry Westerby, who tells Smiley of his trip to Prague where he picked up a story about Jim by a young army conscript, who insisted that the Russians were in the woods waiting a full day before the ambush.

Finally, Smiley tracks down Prideaux. Prideaux tells him Control believed there was a mole in the Circus, and had whittled it down to five men, Alleline (Tinker), Haydon (Tailor), Bland (Soldier), Esterhase (Poorman), and Smiley himself (Beggarman), and that his orders were to obtain the identity from a defector in Czech intelligence who knew. He tells Smiley he almost didn't make the rendezvous with Max because he noticed he was being tailed, and that when he arrived to meet the defector, he was ambushed, taking two bullets to his right shoulder. During his captivity, both Polyakov and Karla interrogated him, focussing solely on the extent and status of Control's investigation. Prideaux suggests that the Czech defector was a plant, contrived by Karla to engineer Control's downfall through Testify's failure, all conceived to protect the mole.

Catching the mole
Smiley confronts Toby Esterhase, stating that he is aware that Esterhase has been posing as a Russian mole, with Polyakov as his handler, in order to provide cover for Merlin's emissary Polyakov. Smiley compels Esterhase into revealing the location of the safe house, through making him realise that not only is there a real Soviet mole embedded in the SIS, but also that Polyakov has not been "turned" to work in British interest pretending to run the "mole" Esterhase, and in fact remains Karla's agent. Tarr is sent to Paris, where he passes a coded message to Alleline about "information crucial to the well-being of the Service". This triggers an emergency meeting between Gerald and Polyakov at the safe house, where Smiley and Guillam are lying in wait.

Haydon is revealed to be the mole, and his interrogation reveals that he had been recruited several decades ago by Karla and became a full-fledged Soviet spy partly for political reasons, partly in frustration at Britain's rapidly declining influence on the world stage, particularly on account of the failings at Suez. He is expected to be exchanged with the Soviet Union for several of the agents he betrayed, but is killed shortly before he is due to leave England. Although the identity of his killer is not explicitly revealed, it is strongly implied to be Prideaux, due to the method of execution echoing the way he euthanises an injured owl earlier in the book. Smiley is appointed temporary head of the Circus to deal with the fallout, and is still head at the start of the second book of The Karla Trilogy, The Honourable Schoolboy.

Characters 
 George Smiley: Educated at Oxford, he was a senior officer in the Circus, before being eased out upon Operation Testify's failure. He is called upon to investigate the presence of a Soviet mole in the Circus.
 Sir Percy Alleline: Chief of the Circus following Control's ousting. Alleline spent his early career in South America, northern Africa and India. He is seen to be vain and overambitious, and is despised by Control. Alleline is knighted in the course of the book in recognition of the quality of the intelligence provided by the source codenamed Merlin. A Lowland Scot, son of a Presbyterian minister, Alleline came to the Circus from a City company.
 Roy Bland: Second in command of London Station to Bill Haydon. Recruited by Smiley at Oxford, he was the top specialist in Soviet satellite states and spent several years under cover as a left-wing academic in the Balkans before being instated in the Circus.
 Control: Former head of the Circus and now dead. Before the war he was a  Cambridge don.
 Toby Esterhase: He is the head of the lamplighters, the section of the Circus responsible for surveillance and  wiretapping.  Hungarian by birth, Esterhase is an anglophile with pretensions of being a British gentleman. He was recruited by Smiley as "a starving student in Vienna".
 Peter Guillam: He is the head of the scalphunters, the section of the Circus used in operations that require physical action and/or violence, and is based in Brixton. Son of a French businessman and an Englishwoman, he is a longtime associate of Smiley.
 Bill Haydon: Commander of London Station, he has worked with the Circus since the war. A polymath, he was recruited at  Oxford where he was a close companion of Prideaux. One of Ann Smiley's cousins, he has an affair with her, and this knowledge subsequently becomes widely known. One of the four who ran the double agent codenamed Merlin.
 Oliver Lacon: A  Permanent Secretary in Great Britain's Cabinet Office. Civilian overseer of the Circus. A former Cambridge rowing blue; his father "a dignitary of the Scottish church" and his mother "something noble".
 Mendel: Retired former Inspector in the Special Branch, he assists Smiley during his investigation. Frequently a go-between for Smiley and other members helping him investigate.
 Jim Prideaux: His Circus codename was Jim Ellis. Raised abroad partially, he is first identified as a prospective recruit by fellow student Bill Haydon at Oxford. He was shot in Czechoslovakia during the collapse of Operation Testify. Former head of the scalphunters. Now teaches at a boys' prep school.
 Connie Sachs: Former Russia analyst for the Circus, she is forced to retire, and now runs a rooming house in Oxford. Alcoholic, but with an excellent memory. She is said to have been modelled upon Milicent Bagot.
 Miles Sercombe: The Government Minister to whom Lacon and the Circus are responsible. A distant cousin of Smiley's wife, he plays a peripheral role in Smiley's investigation. Not highly regarded.
 Ricki Tarr: A field agent who supplies information that indicates there is a Soviet mole in the Circus. He was trained by Smiley. Works for Guillam as one of the scalphunters.

Jargon 
Tinker Tailor Soldier Spy employs spy jargon that is presented as the authentic insider-speak of British Intelligence. Le Carré noted that, with the exception of a few terms like mole and legend, this jargon was his own invention. In some cases, terms used in the novel have subsequently entered espionage parlance. For example, the terms mole, implying a long-term spy, and honey trap, implying a ploy in which an attractive person lures another into revealing information, were first introduced in this novel, and have only subsequently entered general usage.

The television adaptation of Tinker Tailor Soldier Spy also uses the term "burrower" for a researcher recruited from a university, a term taken from the novel's immediate sequel The Honourable Schoolboy.

Moscow Centre
Moscow Centre is a nickname used by John le Carré for the Moscow central headquarters of the KGB, especially those departments concerned with foreign espionage and counterintelligence. It arises from use by Soviet officers themselves, and Le Carré likely just used the nickname to gain greater credibility for his books.

The part of Moscow Centre most often referred to in Le Carré's novels is the fictional Thirteenth Directorate headed by Karla, the code name for a case officer who has risen and fallen from political favour several times and was at one point "blown" by the British in the 1950s. Karla and George Smiley meet while Karla is in prison in Delhi, with Smiley trying to persuade Karla to defect during an interrogation in which Karla gives nothing away. Karla refuses these advances and eventually returns to favour in the USSR, masterminding the Witchcraft/Source Merlin operations supporting the mole Gerald in the Circus. Karla possesses a cigarette lighter given to Smiley by his wife, which he took during Smiley's interrogation of him.

Critical response 
In a review for The New York Times written upon the novel's release in 1974, critic Richard Locke called Tinker Tailor Soldier Spy "fluently written", noting that "it is full of vivid character sketches of secret agents and bureaucrats from all levels of British society, and the dialogue catches their voices well." He praised the novel's realism, calling the detailing of "the day to day activities of the intelligence service at home and abroad" convincing. He noted that the "scale and complexity of this novel are much greater than in any of Le Carré's previous books", while the "characterisation too has become much richer".

An article published in in-house Central Intelligence Agency journal Studies in Intelligence, presumably written by agents under pseudonyms, called it "one of the most enduring renderings of the profession". It does question the "organisational compression" involved in the form of a large organisation, which the SIS would be, being reduced to a handful of senior operatives playing operational roles, but admits that this "works very well at moving the story along in print". However, the idea that a major counter-intelligence operation could be run without the knowledge of counter-intelligence professionals, an allusion to Smiley's investigation progressing in an undetected manner, is deemed an "intellectual stretch".

John Powers of NPR has called it the greatest spy story ever told, noting that it "offers the seductive fantasy of entering a secret world, one imagined with alluring richness". Le Carré himself believed the novel to be among his best works.

In Le Carré's obituary in The Daily Telegraph it read: "He transformed espionage fiction in the masterworks The Spy Who Came in From the Cold and Tinker Tailor Soldier Spy."

Allusions and references 
In the book, Sarratt is a Circus facility, containing a training school for British spies and a holding centre for persons undergoing debriefing or interrogation or in quarantine. This is a reference to an actual village near Watford in which Le Carré worked as a teenager in a department store. Other Circus locations mentioned are a converted laundry in Acton from which the Lamplighters section operates, and a disused school in Brixton, home of the Scalphunters section.

In other media

Television 

A TV adaptation of the Tinker Tailor Soldier Spy was made by the BBC in 1979. It was a seven-part serial and was released in September of that year. The series was directed by John Irvin, produced by Jonathan Powell, and starred Alec Guinness as George Smiley, with Ian Richardson as Bill Haydon. Ricki Tarr was played by Hywel Bennett. In the US, syndicated broadcasts and DVD releases compressed the seven-part UK episodes into six, by shortening scenes and altering the narrative sequence.

Radio 
In 1988, BBC Radio 4 broadcast a dramatisation, by Rene Basilico, of Tinker Tailor Soldier Spy in seven weekly half-hour episodes, produced by John Fawcett-Wilson. It is available as a BBC audiobook in CD and audio cassette formats. Notably, Bernard Hepton portrays George Smiley. Nine years earlier, he had portrayed Toby Esterhase in the television adaptation.

In 2009, BBC Radio 4 also broadcast new dramatisations, by Shaun McKenna, of the eight George Smiley novels by John le Carré, featuring Simon Russell Beale as Smiley. Tinker Tailor Soldier Spy was broadcast as three one-hour episodes, from Sunday 29 November to Sunday 13 December 2009 in BBC Radio 4's Classic Serial slot. The producer was Steven Canny. The series was repeated on BBC Radio 4 Extra in June and July 2016, and has since been released as a boxed set by the BBC.

Film 

Swedish director Tomas Alfredson made a film adaptation in 2011, based on a screenplay by Bridget O'Connor and Peter Straughan. The film was released in the UK and Ireland on 16 September 2011, and in the United States on 9 December 2011. It included a cameo appearance by Le Carré in the Christmas party scene as the older man in the grey suit who stands suddenly to sing the Soviet anthem. The film received numerous Academy Award nominations, including a nomination for Best Actor for Gary Oldman for his role as George Smiley. The film also starred Colin Firth as Bill Haydon, Benedict Cumberbatch as Peter Guillam, Tom Hardy as Ricki Tarr, and Mark Strong as Jim Prideaux.

See also
First Chief Directorate

Notes

References

External links 

 The Museum of Broadcast Communications: Tinker Tailor Soldier Spy – British Miniseries
 British Film Institute Screen Online: Tinker Tailor Soldier Spy (1979)
 

Fiction set in 1973
1974 British novels
British novels adapted into films
Cold War spy novels
Hodder & Stoughton books
British novels adapted into television shows
Novels by John le Carré
Cold War in popular culture
British spy novels
Novels set in London
Secret Intelligence Service in fiction